Yaryna Yaroslavivna Chornohuz is a Ukrainian poet, military medic, and senior corporal of the Armed Forces of Ukraine.

Early life and education 
Chornoguz was born in 1995 in the city of Kyiv. She is the granddaughter of Ukrainian writer .

She attended Kyiv-Mohyla Academy, where she studied philology and literature.

Career 
While pursuing her master's degree, she also worked at a publishing house as a translator, which included translating books from English to Ukrainian.

Chornoguz joined the Ukrainian military in 2019 as a medic with the volunteer battalion "Hospitallers", serving as a combat medic during the War in Donbas. On 22 January 2020, her boyfriend Mykola Sorochuk was killed in action while in the Talakivka region during the war. After the death of her partner, she became a contract soldier for the Ukrainian Armed Forces, eventually serving with the 140th Marine Reconnaissance Battalion.

Later that year, Ukrainian President Volodymyr Zelenskyy agreed to allow representatives from separatist regions Luhansk and Donetsk to join a new council that would advise on peace in the Donbas, a decision that was seen by some Ukrainians as giving legitimacy to Russian aggression. On 13 March 2020, Chornoguz began a solo protest against this decision by camping out in front of the Presidential Office in Kyiv. At the time, due to the spread of COVID-19, public protesting was illegal in Ukraine. Within a few days, 500 people joined her protest.

In 2020, her book Як вигинається воєнне коло (English: How the War Circle Bends) was published. It contained a collection of free verse poetry about trench warfare, written during her time serving on the front lines in the Ukrainian military.

In 2021, she was included on Focus magazine's list of 100 most influential women of Ukraine.

Chornohuz was serving in Donbas when Russia invaded Ukraine in 2022, and she continued to serve in the war, fighting in Popasna, Mariupol and Bakhmut. Later that year, Chornohuz and three other female Ukrainian soldiers traveled to the United States to speak to members of Congress and appeal for more military vehicles and equipment for Ukraine.

Awards 

 Medal for Lifesaving (Ukraine) (19 May 2022)

References 

National University of Kyiv-Mohyla Academy alumni
Ukrainian women poets
1995 births
Ukrainian military doctors
Living people